Dinesh Kumar Khanna is a former badminton player from India.

Career
Khanna was the men's singles Asian champion in 1965, and became the first Indian to win an Asian badminton title on 14 November 1965. He won a bronze medal in the 1966 Commonwealth Games . He was Indian national badminton champion in 1966 and a recipient of Arjuna award in 1965. He was the first Indian, post-independence, to reach the semi-finals of the All England Open Badminton Championships, in 1966. Based on his performance in various international tournaments in 1966, he was seeded joint 3rd in 1967 All England championship, which reflected unofficial world ranking, in the absence of regular formal world ranking at that time. Represented India from 1961 to 1976 in various international tournaments, including 5 Thomas Cup series from 1963 to 1976. Runners-up in youth international tournament held in Malaya (now Malaysia )in 1962.

Achievements

Asian Championships 
Men's singles

Commonwealth Games 
Men's singles

References 

Indian male badminton players
1943 births
Living people
Indian national badminton champions
Badminton players at the 1966 British Empire and Commonwealth Games
Commonwealth Games bronze medallists for India
Recipients of the Arjuna Award
Asian Games medalists in badminton
Badminton players at the 1974 Asian Games
Asian Games bronze medalists for India
Commonwealth Games medallists in badminton
Racket sportspeople from Punjab, India
Sportspeople from Gurdaspur district
Medalists at the 1974 Asian Games
20th-century Indian people
21st-century Indian people
Medallists at the 1966 British Empire and Commonwealth Games